Joseph Lynn (31 January 1925  – June 1992) was a former professional footballer, who played for Huddersfield Town, Exeter City and Rochdale. He was born in Seaton Sluice, Northumberland.

References

1925 births
1992 deaths
English footballers
Footballers from Northumberland
Association football midfielders
English Football League players
Huddersfield Town A.F.C. players
Exeter City F.C. players
Rochdale A.F.C. players